Gábor Máthé may refer to:

Gábor Máthé (footballer) (born 1985) Hungarian goalkeeper
Gábor Máthé (tennis) (born 1985)
Gábor Máthé (lawyer) (born 1941) Hungarian legal historian, professor, president of the Hungarian Law Association

See also
Gábor Máté (disambiguation)